Provincial Highway 64 (台64線, PH 64) is a  expressway in Taiwan entirely within the limits of New Taipei City. Also known as East-West Expressway, Bali-Xindian Line, the route begins in Port of Taipei in Bali District and ends near the western end of Xiulang Bridge in Zhonghe District, linking many major population centers within New Taipei together, including Sanchong, Banqiao, and Zhonghe. It is one of twelve east-west expressways of western Taiwan linking Freeways 1 and 3.

Route description
As an elevated expressway, PH 64 traverses through rural, suburban, and urban areas of New Taipei City. Beginning near the Port of Taipei in Bali District, the route  proceeds southeast, crossing over PH 15 and CR 105. Then the route turns east and tunnels through Guanyin Mountain through the Guanyinshan Tunnel. The route emerges from the tunnel near Chengzilao of Wugu District, turning south along the west shore of the Erchong Flood Diversion Path (二重疏洪道). PH 64 then intersects with CR 108, with an indirect connection to Freeway 1 available via a viaduct over CR 108 and CR 107A at this interchange. Then the expressway crosses over Freeway 1 and leaves Wugu.

As the route enters Sanchong, it leaves the rural areas of the city and takes on a more suburban character. PH 64 continues southeast along the Erchong Flood Diversion Path, and then crosses over the Dahan River while running parallel with the New Taipei Expressway on Chongcui Bridge as it exits Sanchong and enters Banqiao. The route proceeds southwest, straddling the southern shore of the Dahan River before turning southeast near CR 106A and Dahan Bridge into central Banqiao. Here the expressway enters the urban areas of New Taipei, with tall buildings closely lining the sides of the expressway, and proceeds like this until the eastern terminus.

The expressway continues above CR 106A, which is Minsheng Road in Banqiao, and becomes Zhongzheng Road in Zhonghe. At the interchange with Freeway 3 in Zhonghe, the route bends from south to east. It then continues above Zhongzheng Road (CR 106A) and then Jingping Road (CR 106) in Zhonghe before terminating near the western end of Xiulang Bridge. The route does not actually reach Xindian; to get there, one needs to use the Xiulang Bridge, which is on CR 106 and not PH 64.

History
The road was originally planned as a mostly at-grade boulevard by the Taipei County Government known as Special Route 1 (特一號道路) from Xiulang Bridge in Zhonghe to Wugu Industrial Park (now New Taipei Industrial Park) through Banqiao and Xinzhuang. Originally the only elevated section of the route was from Dahan Bridge to Minsheng Overpass in Banqiao. In the 1990s, as part of the expressway plans in Taiwan, the Special Route 1 corridor was selected to be upgraded to an expressway-grade Provincial Highway as PH 64. However, due to highway revolts from residents of Xinzhuang and central Wugu, the western portion of PH 64 was realigned to the present route, which bypassed the controversial areas by using the right-of-way near the levees and terminated at Taipei Port in Bali instead of Wugu Industrial Park.

The road opened in stages, and was completed by late 2009. The section from Banqiao to Zhonghe opened in 2000, while the section from Banqiao to Bali opened in 2009. Bicyclists and pedestrians had exclusive use of the expressway, and some celebratory events took place to celebrate the completion of PH 64.

Exit list
The entire route is in New Taipei City.

See also
 Highway system in Taiwan

References

External links

Directorate General of Highways, MOTC
Construction and Planning Agency, Ministry of the Interior

Viaducts in Taiwan
Highways in Taiwan
Roads in Taipei